Lukovo Šugarje   is a village in Croatia.  It is connected by the D8 highway.

References

Populated places in Lika-Senj County